In enzymology, a quinate O-hydroxycinnamoyltransferase is an enzyme that catalyzes the chemical reaction

feruloyl-CoA + quinate  CoA + O-feruloylquinate

Thus, the two substrates of this enzyme are feruloyl-CoA and quinate, whereas its two products are CoA and O-feruloylquinate.

This enzyme belongs to the family of transferases, specifically those acyltransferases transferring groups other than aminoacyl groups.  The systematic name of this enzyme class is feruloyl-CoA:quinate O-(hydroxycinnamoyl)transferase. This enzyme is also called hydroxycinnamoyl coenzyme A-quinate transferase.  This enzyme participates in phenylpropanoid biosynthesis.

References 

 
 
 

EC 2.3.1
Enzymes of unknown structure
Hydroxycinnamic acids metabolism